Aurora Browne is a Canadian actress and comedian, best known as one of the creators and stars of the sketch comedy series Baroness von Sketch Show.

Early life
She is originally from Thunder Bay, Ontario, and currently based in Toronto.

Career 
In 2000, she was nominated for the Tim Sims Encouragement Fund Award.  Also in that year she was hired by Toronto's The Second City comedy troupe.  While there she co-wrote and performed in four Mainstage revues: "Family Circus Maximus", "Psychedelicatessen", "Insanity Fair" and "The Bush League of Justice".  She co-starred in four seasons of the CTV/Comedy Network production Comedy Inc.  She made a guest appearance on the second season of Corner Gas.  She won the 2008 Canadian Comedy Award for Best Female Improviser.

She co-produced and acted the role of Vampira in the Toronto Fringe Festival production of Ed Wood's classic Plan 9 from Outer Space named Plan Live! From Outer Space.  "Plan Live! From Outer Space" received the 2007 Canadian Comedy Award for Best Comedic Play.

At the 5th Canadian Screen Awards in 2017, Browne and her Baroness von Sketch Show castmates Meredith MacNeill, Carolyn Taylor and Jennifer Whalen were nominated for Best Ensemble Performance in a Variety or Sketch Comedy Series, and won the award for Best Writing in a Variety or Sketch Comedy Series; at the 6th Canadian Screen Awards in 2018, the troupe won the awards in both of the same categories. At the 7th Canadian Screen Awards in 2019, the troupe again won the award for Best Writing in a Variety or Sketch Comedy Series, and Browne was nominated for Best Lead Performance in a Digital Program or Series for the webseries The Writers' Block. Currently, she voices Gracie in Agent Binky: Pets of the Universe.

As of 2022, she has a recurring role in the CBC Television sitcom Run the Burbs.

Filmography

Film

Television

References

External links

Living people
Canadian women comedians
Canadian film actresses
Year of birth missing (living people)
Writers from Thunder Bay
Actresses from Ontario
Canadian sketch comedians
Canadian comedy writers
Canadian television actresses
Canadian television writers
Canadian voice actresses
Canadian Screen Award winners
Canadian women television writers
21st-century Canadian comedians
Comedians from Ontario
Canadian Comedy Award winners